Sulistiyanto (born 2 October 1961) is a former rear admiral in the Indonesian Navy who served as its chief of staff (Indonesian: Kepala Staf Angkatan Laut, abbreviated KSAL or Kasal) to the Pati Headquarters in the navy.

Career 
He is an alumnus of the AAL-29th Naval Academy in 1984. He is also an alumnus of DCCS India (Sesko) 52nd FY 1996/1997. During his service in the Navy, he has received many awards, including Bintang Yudha Dharma Nararya, Bintang Jalasena Nararya, Satya Lancana (SL) Kuwait State, SL Setiana VIII, SL Allegiance XVI, SL Allegiance XXIV, SL Santi Dharma and The United Nations Medal PBB.

Since his AAL education, he has been given the opportunity to sail abroad on the KRI Dewaruci and the Kartika Jala Krida cruise in 1983. From that experience, Sulistiyanto has served as a Military Observer at Unikom which is a person under the United Nations in between the Iraq-Kuwait border for approximately 13 months and has served as a Marine Attache at the Indonesian Embassy in Kuala Lumpur, Malaysia.

On Thursday, 9 August 2018, the School of Staff and Naval Command (Seskoal) held a special ceremony in a series of activities to hand over the position of Danseskoal from Rear Admiral Sulistiyanto to the Rear Admiral Dr. Amarulla Octavian, as well as a farewell to Sulistiyanto, to all residents of Seskoal in connection with the end of his tenure as Danseskoal which he has held for 8 months.

Awards 

 Bintang Yudha Dharma Nararya

 Bintang Jalasena Nararya

 Satyalancana Kesetiaan 32 years' service

 Satyalancana Dharma Samudra

 Satyalancana Kesetiaan 24 years' service

 Satyalancana Kesetiaan 16 years' service

 Satyalancana Kesetiaan 8 years' service

 Satyalancana Dwidya Sistha

 Satyalancana Seroja

 Satyalancana Dharma Nusa

 Satyalancana Wira Nusa

 Satyalancana Wira Dharma

 Satyalancana Kebhaktian Sosial

 Satyalancana Bhakti Buana

 United Nations Iraq–Kuwait Observation Mission

Position 

 Ass Padiv AKS KRI SAM-341 Satkor Koarmatim (1984)
 Padiv Bah KRI LAM-374 Satkor Koarmatim (1985)
 Pwa Bahari KRI AMY- 351 (1986)
 Padiv Nagi KRI YNS-332 (1989)
 Kadepops KRI Badik-623 Satrol Koarmatim (1991)
 Komandan KRI Siberau-847 Satrol Koarmabar (1991)
 Pabanda Staf Binkar Spers Mabes ABRI (1993)
 Military Observers Unikom Mabes ABRI (1995)
 Palaksa KRI OSA-972 Satlinlamil Jakarta (1996)
 Komandan KRI Ambonia-503 (1999)
 Komandan KRI Teluk Langsa-501 (2000)
 Pabandya-3 Sops KASUM TNI (2002)
 Athan RI Kuala Lumpur Malaysia (2004)
 Aspers Koarmabar (2007)
 Sahli C Ops Pangarmabar (2008)
 Paban VI Srenum Mabes TNI (2009)
 Sahli A Wilnas Pangarmabar (2011)
 Pabanren I Sopsal Mabesal (2011)
 Kadiskomlekal Mabesal (2013)
 Karo Kerma Settama Lemhannas (2013)
 Komandan Kodikopsla Kobangdikal (2014)
 Danlantamal IV Tanjung Pinang (2015)
 Wadan Seskoal (2016)
 Kadisdikal (2016)
 Danseskoal (2017)
 Dekan Fakultas Manajemen Pertahanan Unhan (2018)
 Staf Khusus Kasal (2019)

See also 

 Indonesian military ranks

References 

1961 births
Living people
Indonesian admirals
People from Yogyakarta
Chiefs of Staff of the Indonesian Navy